Christophe Taine (born 12 December 1973) is a French professional football manager and former player who is the head coach of Championnat National 2 club FC 93. As a player, he was an attacking midfielder.

Managerial career 
Formerly, Taine had been the head coach of Fleury, and in January 2019, he was put in charge of setting up the youth academy at the club.

On 10 June 2022, Taine was appointed as head coach of Championnat National 2 side FC 93.

References

External links
 Christophe Taine profile at footballdatabase.eu

1973 births
Living people
People from Caudry
French footballers
Association football midfielders
AS Beauvais Oise players
USF Fécamp players
ES Troyes AC players
Amiens SC players
Paris FC players
Levallois SC players
CS Sedan Ardennes players
FC Istres players
Limoges FC players
Olympique Noisy-le-Sec players
Ligue 2 players
Championnat National players
French football managers
Paris FC managers
Sportspeople from Nord (French department)
Footballers from Hauts-de-France